Amplibuteo is an extinct genus of birds of prey, belonging to the family Accipitridae.

References

Accipitridae
Fossil taxa described in 1979